Gustavo Bolívar may refer to:
 Gustavo Bolívar (footballer) (born 1985), Colombian football player
 Gustavo Bolívar (author) (born 1966), Colombian author, screenwriter and journalist